The following is a list of notable non-governmental organisations in Cyprus.

Civil society 
Future Worlds Center
KISA

Cultural 
Pharos Arts Foundation

Peace-promoting NGOs 
 Cyprus Conflict Resolution Trainers Group
 Future Worlds Center

Political organisations 
 New Wave – The Other Cyprus
 Union of Cypriots

Research organisations 
 Cyprus Neuroscience and Technology Institute
 The Cyprus Institute
 The Cyprus Institute of Neurology and Genetics
 The Cyprus International Institute of Management
 The Cyprus Space Exploration Organisation (CSEO)

References 

NGO Cyprus